Antillophos is a genus of sea snails, marine gastropod mollusks in the family Nassariidae.

Taxonomy
This genus was treated within family Buccinidae. It was moved to family Nassariidae in 2016.

Species
According to the World Register of Marine Species (WoRMS), the following species with valid names are included  within the genus Antillophos :

 Antillophos adelus (Schwengel, 1942)
 Antillophos bahamensis Petuch, 2002
 Antillophos bathyketes (Watson, 1882)
 Antillophos beaui (Fischer & Bernardi, 1860)
 Antillophos candeanus (d’Orbigny, 1842)
 Antillophos chalcedonius (Watters, 2009)
 Antillophos chazaliei (Dautzenberg, 1900)
 Antillophos elegans (Guppy, 1866)
 Antillophos grateloupianus (Petit, 1853)
 Antillophos naucratoros (Watson, 1882)
 Antillophos oxyglyptus (Dall & Simpson, 1901)
 Antillophos smithi (Watson, 1886)
 Antillophos veraguensis (Hinds, 1843)
 Antillophos verriculum Watters, 2009
 Antillophos virginiae (Schwengel, 1942)

Species brought into synonymy
 Antillophos adelus (Schwengel, 1942): synonym of Parviphos adelus (Schwengel, 1942)
 Antillophos alabastrum (Fraussen, 2003): synonym of Phos alabastrum Fraussen, 2003
 Antillophos armillatus Fraussen & Poppe, 2005: synonym of Phos armillatus (Fraussen & Poppe, 2005)
 Antillophos bayeri Petuch, 1987: synonym of Antillophos oxyglyptus (Dall & C. T. Simpson, 1901)
 Antillophos borneensis (G.B. Sowerby, 1859): synonym of Phos borneensis G. B. Sowerby II, 1859
 Antillophos boucheti (Fraussen, 2003): synonym of Phos boucheti Fraussen, 2003
 Antillophos brigitteae Stahlschmidt & Fraussen, 2009: synonym of Phos brigitteae (Stahlschmidt & Fraussen, 2009)
 Antillophos dedonderi Fraussen & Poppe, 2005: synonym of Phos dedonderi (Fraussen & Poppe, 2005)
 Antillophos deprinsi Fraussen & Poppe, 2005: synonym of Phos deprinsi (Fraussen & Poppe, 2005)
 Antillophos durianoides Fraussen & Poppe, 2005: synonym of Phos durianoides (Fraussen & Poppe, 2005)
 Antillophos elegantissimus (Hayashi & Habe, 1965): synonym of Phos elegantissimus Hayashi & Habe, 1965
 Antillophos fasciatus (A. Adams, 1853): synonym of Phos fasciatus A. Adams, 1854
 Antillophos freemani Petuch, 2002: synonym of Antillophos smithi (R. B. Watson, 1885)
 Antillophos gemmulifer (Kilburn, 2000): synonym of Phos gemmulifer Kilburn, 2000
 Antillophos hastilis Fraussen & Poppe, 2005: synonym of Phos hastilis (Fraussen & Poppe, 2005)
 Antillophos hayashii (Shikama, 1977): synonym of Phos hayashii Shikama, 1977
 Antillophos hirasei (G.B. Sowerby III, 1913): synonym of Phos hirasei G. B. Sowerby III, 1913
 Antillophos idyllium Fraussen & Poppe, 2005: synonym of Phos idyllium (Fraussen & Poppe, 2005)
 Antillophos intactus Fraussen & Poppe, 2005: synonym of Phos intactus (Fraussen & Poppe, 2005)
 Antillophos laevis (Kuroda & Habe in Habe, 1961): synonym of Phos laevis Kuroda & Habe in Habe, 1961
 Antillophos liui S.-Q. Zhang & S.-P. Zhang, 2014: synonym of Phos liui (S.-Q. Zhang & S.-P. Zhang, 2014)
 Antillophos lucubratonis Fraussen & Poppe, 2005: synonym of Phos lucubratonis (Fraussen & Poppe, 2005)
 Antillophos makiyamai (Kuroda, 1961): synonym of Phos makiyamai Kuroda, 1961
 Antillophos miculus Fraussen & Poppe, 2005: synonym of Phos miculus (Fraussen & Poppe, 2005)
 Antillophos minutus (Schepman, 1911): synonym of Phos minutus Schepman, 1911
 Antillophos monsecourorum Fraussen & Poppe, 2005: synonym of Phos monsecourorum (Fraussen & Poppe, 2005)
 Antillophos nigroliratus (Habe, 1961): synonym of Phos nigroliratus Habe, 1961
 Antillophos nitens (G.B. Sowerby III, 1901): synonym of Phos nitens G. B. Sowerby III, 1901
 Antillophos opimus Fraussen & Poppe, 2005: synonym of Phos opimus (Fraussen & Poppe, 2005)
 Antillophos pyladeum (Kato, 1994): synonym of Phos pyladeum Kato, 1995
 Antillophos retecosus (Hinds, 1844): synonym of Phos retecosus Hinds, 1844
 Antillophos roseatus (Hinds, 1844): synonym of Phos roseatus Hinds, 1844 
 Antillophos rufocinctus (A. Adams, 1851): synonym of Phos rufocinctus A. Adams, 1851
 Antillophos scitamentus Fraussen & Poppe, 2005: synonym of Phos scitamentus (Fraussen & Poppe, 2005)
 Antillophos sculptilis (Watson, 1886): synonym of Phos sculptilis Watson, 1886
 Antillophos tsokobuntodis Fraussen & Poppe, 2005: synonym of Phos tsokobuntodis (Fraussen & Poppe, 2005)
 Antillophos usquamaris Fraussen, 2005: synonym of Phos usquamaris (Fraussen, 2005)
 Antillophos varicosus (Gould, 1849): synonym of Phos varicosus Gould, 1849
 Antillophos verbinneni Fraussen, 2009: synonym of Phos verbinneni (Fraussen, 2009)

References

External links

Nassariidae
Gastropod genera